George Albert Kerr (January 27, 1924 – May 21, 2007) was a politician in Ontario, Canada. He served in the Legislative Assembly of Ontario from 1963 to 1985, and was a cabinet minister in the governments of John Robarts and Bill Davis. Kerr was a member of the Progressive Conservative Party and was the first person to hold the portfolio of environment minister in any provincial or federal cabinet in Canada.

Background
He was born in Montreal, Quebec, and educated at the University of New Brunswick and Dalhousie Law School. He worked as a lawyer.

Politics
He served on the town council of Burlington, Ontario, from 1955 to 1957 and from 1960 to 1962.

Kerr was elected to the Ontario legislature in the 1963 provincial election, defeating Liberal Party candidate Owen Mullin by 6,372 votes in Halton.  He served as a backbench supporter of Robarts's government for four years, and was re-elected in the 1967 election.  He was appointed to cabinet on June 5, 1969, as Minister of Energy and Resources Management.

Kerr was the only cabinet minister to support Darcy McKeough's bid to succeed Robarts as party leader at the 1971 Progressive Conservative Party leader leadership convention. McKeough was eliminated on the second-last ballot, and, with Kerr, gave his support to Bill Davis.

Davis won the contest, and initially retained Kerr in the Energy and Resources Management portfolio. On April 6, 1970, he closed commercial fisheries and issued warning against consumption of fish in the area. According to a 2018 article in The Guardian, in August 1970 Kerr had reassured the local community that the Wabigoon river would recover naturally within twelve weeks without government intervention or a clean up. In a speech to the Ontario parliament in 2010, MP Norman W. Sterling, said that Kerr had made up the estimate of twelve weeks, and quoted Kerr as saying, "If I had said it was going to be flushed out in one or two years, they would never have believed me." Sterling's words were "met with laughter in the Ontario parliament".

On July 23, 1971, he was named Minister of the Environment, the first such Cabinet minister in Canada.

Following the 1971 election, Kerr was named as Minister of Colleges and Universities. On September 28 of the same year, he was again transferred to become Provincial Secretary for Justice. This post was a "super-ministry", overseeing the offices of the Attorney-General, the Solicitor-General, the Minister of Correctional Services and the Minister of Consumer and Corporate Affairs.  While a strong position in theory, the office lacked defined administrative objectives, and ministers who held the position were often marginalized in legislative debates.

On February 26, 1974, Kerr was relieved of this position and named as Solicitor-General. He temporarily resigned from cabinet on February 21, 1975, after allegations that he had solicited and received money from a man involved in a harbour scandal in Hamilton. Kerr protested his innocence, but argued that he could not function as the province's Solicitor-General while the matter was unresolved. A subsequent investigation found no grounds to warrant charges against Kerr, and he was briefly returned to cabinet before leaving again on July 18.

The Progressive Conservatives were reduced to a minority government in the 1975 provincial election.  Kerr, re-elected for the new constituency of Burlington South, was returned to cabinet on October 7 as Minister of the Environment. He held this position until January 21, 1978, when he was again named Solicitor-General and Provincial Secretary for Justice.

He resigned a second time as Solicitor-General after he made a telephone call to an assistant crown attorney on behalf of a constituent who was facing trial for driving while his licence was suspended. The call quickly became public and Kerr resigned from cabinet on Sept. 9, 1978.

Kerr was re-elected in the 1981 provincial election, and served as a government backbencher for the next four years.  He retired from the legislature in 1985.

Kerr died on Victoria Day, 2007.

Cabinet posts

References

External links
 

1924 births
2007 deaths
Schulich School of Law alumni
Members of the Executive Council of Ontario
Progressive Conservative Party of Ontario MPPs
Burlington, Ontario city councillors